Danrlei Rosa dos Santos (born 1 August 1994) is a footballer who hails from São Luiz Gonzaga, Brazil. He plays for Grêmio Anápolis and can play either as a centre back or right back.

He became a professional in 2014 and played in the youth of Atletico Paranaense before joining Joinville.

References

External links
Danrlei at ZeroZero

Brazilian footballers
Living people
1994 births
Association football defenders
Esporte Clube Juventude players
Club Athletico Paranaense players
Joinville Esporte Clube players
Mogi Mirim Esporte Clube players
ABC Futebol Clube players
Madureira Esporte Clube players
Cuiabá Esporte Clube players
Sociedade Esportiva e Recreativa Caxias do Sul players
Vila Nova Futebol Clube players
Campeonato Brasileiro Série A players
Campeonato Brasileiro Série B players
Campeonato Brasileiro Série C players